Eodorcadion is a genus of longhorn beetles of the subfamily Lamiinae, containing the following species:

subgenus Eodorcadion
 Eodorcadion altaicum (Suvorov, 1909)
 Eodorcadion carinatum (Fabricius, 1781)
 Eodorcadion chinganicum (Suvorov, 1909)
 Eodorcadion darigangense Heyrovský, 1967
 Eodorcadion gansuense (Breuning, 1943)
 Eodorcadion glaucopterum (Ganglbauer, 1883)
 Eodorcadion kadleci Danilevsky, 2007
 Eodorcadion mandschukuoense (Breuning, 1944)
 Eodorcadion maurum (Jakovlev, 1890)
 Eodorcadion multicarinatum (Breuning, 1943)
 Eodorcadion oligocarinatum Danilevsky, 2007
 Eodorcadion ptyalopleurum (Suvorov, 1909)
 Eodorcadion shanxiense Danilevsky, 2007
 Eodorcadion sifanicum (Suvorov, 1912)
 Eodorcadion sinicum Breuning, 1948
 Eodorcadion tuvense Plavilstshikov, 1958
 Eodorcadion virgatum (Motschulsky, 1854)

subgenus Humerodorcadion
 Eodorcadion humerale (Gebler, 1823)
 Eodorcadion lutshniki (Plavilstshikov, 1937)

subgenus Ornatodorcadion
 Eodorcadion argaloides Breuning, 1947
 Eodorcadion brandti (Gebler, 1841)
 Eodorcadion consentaneum (Jakovlev, 1899)
 Eodorcadion dorcas (Jakovlev, 1901)
 Eodorcadion egregium (Reitter, 1897)
 Eodorcadion exaratum (Ménetriés, 1854)
 Eodorcadion gorbunovi Danilevsky, 2004
 Eodorcadion heros (Jakovlev, 1899)
 Eodorcadion intermedium (Jakovlev, 1890)
 Eodorcadion jakovlevi (Suvorov, 1912)
 Eodorcadion kaznakovi (Suvorov, 1912)
 Eodorcadion licenti (Pic, 1939)
 Eodorcadion novitzkyi (Suvorov, 1909)
 Eodorcadion oreadis (Reitter, 1897)
 Eodorcadion ornatum (Faldermann, 1833)
 Eodorcadion oryx (Jakovlev, 1895)
 Eodorcadion potanini (Jakovlev, 1889)
 Eodorcadion zichyi (Csiki, 1901)

References

Dorcadiini